Gottlieb Daniel Paul Weber (19 January 1823 - 12 October 1916) was a German artist. Weber is known for his ethereal and timeless landscape paintings of early northeast America. He emigrated to the U.S. in 1848 and though he returned to Germany around 1860 his influence on American landscape painting was still felt for years.

Early life 
Weber was born in Darmstadt, Germany the son of the composer Johann Daniel Weber (1784–1848). He studied art at the Städelschen Kunstinstitut in Frankfurt before, two years later, moving to Munich to study at the Academy in Munich which became his home base except when he lived in America. Trained at the Akademie der Bildenden Künste, Weber specialized in Alpine landscape painting.

Career 
In 1848, soon after the collapse of the German Republic, at the age of 25, he moved to the United States, settling in Philadelphia, where he was a frequent exhibitor at the Pennsylvania Academy of the Fine Arts from 1849 onward. He also exhibited at the National Academy of Design and the Boston Athaeneum.

Already an accomplished landscape painter by the time he was tirty years old, Weber refashioned himself as a teacher. Among his students in the class of landscape painting were William Trost Richards, William Stanley Haseltine, Edward Moran, and Harriet Cany Peale.

In 1860 he returned to Germany settling back in Munich where he would spend the rest of his life. Weber kept on painting American landscape scenes for European audiences relying on memory and artistic reconstruction. Even after his return, Weber still showed his paintings in America including at the Centennial Exposition in Philadelphia in 1876.

Personal life 
In 1850 his son Carl Weber was born in Philadelphia, who followed in his father's footsteps to become an artist and went on to paint landscapes like his father. Paul had a nephew named Carl Philipp Weber  who also became a painter.

Selection of works 

 Wooded Landscape with Lake and Mountains, 1854, Metropolitan Museum of Art, New York
 Hudson River Landscape, 1854, Arnot Art Museum, Elmira, NY
 Landscape: Evening, 1856,  Pennsylvania Academy of Fine Arts, Philadelphia, PA
 A Scene in the Catskills, 1858, National Gallery of Art, Washington, D.C.
 Chestnut Hill Near Philadelphia, 1863 and Landscape with Two Cows, Woodmere Art Museum, Philadelphia, PA
 Swiss Landscape, 1859, Museum of Fine Arts, Boston, Boston, MA
 Forest scene, mid-1800s, The Walters Art Museum, Baltimore, MD
 Summer Landscape, 1861 and Haying Scene, 1863, Samuel Dorsky Museum, New Paltz, NY
 Pennsylvania Landscape, 1862, High Museum of Art, Atlanta, GA
 Crater Lake in Scottish Highlands, 1861 and Steep Coast (Mediterranean Landscape),1863, Neue Pinakothek, Munich, Germany

Awards 

 1858: Silver medal at the Pennsylvania Academy of Fine Arts, Philadelphia
 1865: Golden medal at the exhibition at the London Crystal Palace

Exhibitions (selection) 
 1901: VIII. International art exhibition in the glass palace, Munich
 1902 Great Berlin Art Exhibition
 1912: Munich annual exhibition in the glass palace
 1917: Paul Weber Memorial at the Heinemann Gallery, Munich
 1918: Paul Weber Darmstädter Kunstverein

References

External links

 https://woodmereartmuseum.org/explore-online/collection/artist/paul-weber
 http://www.artcyclopedia.com/artists/weber_paul.html
 https://www.bedfordfineartgallery.com/carl_philipp_weber_sunset.html

19th-century German painters
19th-century German male artists
German male painters
20th-century German painters
20th-century German male artists
1823 births
1916 deaths
Court painters
Hudson River School painters